Palur is a small village in Chengalpattu district in India. Suburban trains running between Chennai Beach - Chengalpattu - Tirumalpur section and Chengalpattu - Arakkonam section will stop here at Palur railway station. A Sivan Koil is located in this small village and this temple is known as Tirukaleeswarar temple.

IRCTC (Indian Railways) had setup packaged drinking water plant named Railneer at Palur.  Water bottles of Railneer (Palur) is sold in major railway stations and trains of southern railways.
It connects Industrial area of Oragadam - Sriperumbudur where MSME industries operate and Nissan, Royal Enfield, Apollo Tyers, etc.

Palur railway station code is "PALR".

Chengalpattu to Palur Train Schedule
CGL   PALR  Train No.  Train Name

08:20  08:32  156SR     Chengalpattu-Arakkonam passenger

08:35  08:57   BTL1      Chengalpattu–Tirumalpur EMU

18:15  18:31  196SR     Pondicherry–Tirupati passenger

19:20  19:35   BTL3      Chengalpattu–Tirumalpur EMU

20:20  20:30  152SR     Chengalpattu–Arakkonam passenger

20:45  21:07   BTL5      Chengalpattu–Tirumalpur EMU

Palur to Chengalpattu Train Schedule

PALR   CGL   Train No.  Train Name

05:55    06:15  TLB2         Tirumalpur–Chengalpattu EMU

06:51    07:15  151SR       Arakkonam–Chengalpattu Passenger

07:42    07:55  TLB4         Tirumalpur–Chengalpattu EMU

08:51    09:13  195SC       Tirupati–Pondicherry Passenger

10:50    11:10  TLB6         Tirumalpur–Chengalpattu

18:31    19:10  TLB6         Arakkonam-Chengalpattu Passenger

For updated train timings please refer http://www.srailway.com/sutt/cgl-tmpl-cgl.php

Indian Railway Catering and Tourism Corporation (IRCTC) is planning to set up its mineral water manufacturing plant (which is called as Rail Neer plant) at Palur.

References

Villages in Kanchipuram district